Jewellery Quarter station is a combined railway station and tram stop, situated in the Jewellery Quarter of Birmingham, England.  The station is served by West Midlands Trains (who operate the station), Chiltern Railways, and Midland Metro.

The station is set at the mouth of Hockley No 2 Tunnel below the elevation of its road-level access point on Vyse Street; stairs and a lift are provided.

History
Jewellery Quarter station was opened in 1995, as part of the "Jewellery Line" project which saw the re-introduction of cross-city services via Birmingham Snow Hill. Midland Metro services commenced in 1999, when its first (and so far only) line from Birmingham to Wolverhampton opened.

No previous station had existed at this site, however the area was historically served by Hockley station, located a short distance west, which had been opened by the Great Western Railway in 1854, and was closed with the line in 1972.

Facilities
The station has no car park, but ten cycle storage spaces are available. The station has a ticket office, but this has limited opening hours; a self-service ticket machine is provided for use when the ticket hall is closed and for collecting pre-paid tickets.  Train running information is offered via automated announcements, CIS displays, timetable posters and customer help points on each side.

Outside the station entrance on Vyse Street is a sculpture called "Clockwork" by Mark Renn, which dates from 2004. There is also a Victorian cast iron public urinal, dating from around 1880, which is now disused but is grade II listed.

Services

Train
Most trains are operated by West Midlands Trains.  The Monday to Saturday daytime service sees trains approximately every 10 minutes in each direction, operating between Stourbridge Junction, Birmingham Snow Hill, and either Dorridge or Whitlocks End. Many trains continue beyond Stourbridge to Kidderminster, Worcester Foregate Street or Great Malvern, and some continue beyond Whitlocks End & Dorridge to Stratford-upon-Avon.

Unlike WMT services, only a few Chiltern trains call at Jewellery Quarter.

Metro
West Midlands Metro services operate at frequent intervals, between Edgbaston and Wolverhampton St George's. Mondays to Fridays, Midland Metro services in each direction run at six to eight-minute intervals during the day, and at fifteen-minute intervals during the evenings and on Sundays. They run at eight minute intervals on Saturdays.

See also
Transport in Birmingham
List of Midland Metro stations

References

Further reading

External links

Rail Around Birmingham and the West Midlands: Jewellery Quarter railway station

Railway stations opened by Railtrack
Railway stations in Great Britain opened in 1995
Railway stations in Birmingham, West Midlands
DfT Category E stations
West Midlands Metro stops
Railway stations served by Chiltern Railways
Railway stations served by West Midlands Trains